The Trade Union Confederation of Burkina (CSB) is a trade union centre in Burkina Faso. It is affiliated with the International Trade Union Confederation.

References
 

Trade unions in Burkina Faso
International Trade Union Confederation
Burkina Faso